Klimentovo is a village situated in Central North Bulgaria.
It is a part of Polski Trambesh Municipality, Veliko Tarnovo Province.

References 

Villages in Veliko Tarnovo Province